Drygalski Island is an ice-capped island that is  long and rises to  in the Davis Sea of the Southern Ocean, about  north of the coast of Queen Mary Land and  north-northeast of Cape Filchner.

Drygalski Island was first viewed from the continental Antarctic coast in November 1912 by members of the Western Base Party of the Australian Antarctic Expedition (1911-1914), and observed more closely from Sir Douglas Mawson's ship Aurora on the homeward journey in January 1914. Because Drygalski Island was thought to be "Drygalski's High Land", charted by Professor Erich von Drygalski of the German Antarctic Expedition (1901-1903) in 1902, Drygalski's name was given by Sir Douglas Mawson to the island.

A temporary field station named Mir was opened from 20 May to 6 August in 1960 on the island by the Soviet Union to study meteorological conditions.

See also

 Composite Antarctic Gazetteer
 List of Antarctic and sub-Antarctic islands
 List of Antarctic islands south of 60° S
 SCAR
 Territorial claims in Antarctica

References

Islands of Queen Mary Land